Peter H. Fogtdal, Danish novelist and poet, was born May 22, 1956 in Copenhagen, Denmark. He has written 14 novels in Danish. Three have been translated into French, two into Portuguese, and one into English and Ukrainian. In Denmark he is known for writing novels with a spiritual, mystical or humorous slant.
 
In 2005 he won a French literary prize, Prix Littéraire des Ambassadeurs de la Francophonie for his translated novel Le front chantilly (Floedeskumsfronten). In 2001 this novel was named one of the three best novels of the year by the biggest Danish newspaper Jyllands-Posten.

Peter H. Fogtdal lives in Portland, Oregon but goes back to Copenhagen, Denmark often.

Novel in English:

 The Tsar's Dwarf (2008, [Hawthorne Books] Translated by Tiina Nunnally.

Selected novels in Danish:

 Drømmeren fra Palæstina (1998, {L&R}
 Flødeskumsfronten (2001, {L&R}
 Zarens dværg (2006, {L&R}
 Skorpionens hale (2008, {Gyldendal}
 Det egyptiske hjerte (2015, {PeoplesPress}
 Det store glidefald (2017, {Turbine}

Poetry collection and new novel in English:

- My Crimes of Gelato: Second Edition (2021)
- The Mango Dancer (2022)

External links
Litteratursiden profile
Review of The Tsar's Dwarf from Three Percent
Review of The Tsar's Dwarf from The Believer
An Author Interview in Kristeligt Dagblad, Denmark, 2017
An Author Interview in Galinfo, Ukraine, 2018

1956 births
Living people
Writers from Copenhagen
Danish male novelists
20th-century Danish novelists
21st-century Danish novelists
20th-century Danish male writers
21st-century Danish male writers